Zeyndanlu or Zeynadanlu or Zindanlu or Zeydanlu may refer to:
 Borj-e Zeydanlu
 Zeydanlu
 Zeyndanlu-ye Olya
 Zeyndanlu-ye Sofla